No Hay Espacio is a studio album by Black Guayaba, released on September 18, 2007, through Machete Music. In 2008, the album earned the group a Grammy Award for Best Latin Rock/Alternative Album.

Track listing

References

2007 albums
Grammy Award for Best Latin Rock, Urban or Alternative Album
Machete Music albums